Epermenia muraseae is a moth of the family Epermeniidae. It is found in the islands of Honshu and Kyushu of Japan.

The length of the forewings is 4.8–6 mm. It is similar to Epermenia sinjovi, but can be distinguished by the black anterior and posterior dots on the disc.

The larvae feed on Pittosporum tobira.

References

Moths described in 2000
Epermeniidae
Moths of Japan